The sambal is a folk membranophone instrument from Western India. It consists of two wooden drums united from a side, with skin heads stretched on their top mouths. One drum is higher in pitch than the other one. This instrument is played with two wooden sticks, one beater having a circular tip. The sambal is also a traditional drum of the Gondhali people. The sambal is a folk drum found among the Kokna people of Dadra, Nagar Haveli, Maharashtra, Goa and North Karnataka in Western India.

Sambal is a traditional instrument used by the peoples who are servants of goddess Mahalaxmi Devi and used in the gondhal pooja.

References

External links
YouTube video
Photo

Drums
Asian percussion instruments
Indian musical instruments